The descendants of Philip V of Spain, Bourbon monarch of the Kingdom of Spain, Kingdom of Naples, and Kingdom of Sicily are numerous. He had two wives; by his first wife Maria Luisa of Savoy he had two children. After the death of his first wife Philip married Elisabeth of Parma and they had children. Philip's descendants have formed a major part of history around the globe; several becoming monarchs of Spain, Portugal and Sardinia.

His descendants also founded several cadet branches; the House of Bourbon-Parma in the Duchy of Parma and the House of Bourbon-Two Sicilies in the Kingdom of the Two Sicilies. This article deals with the children of Philip V and in turn their senior descendants.

Background of Philip V of Spain

Philip was born at the Palace of Versailles in France. His older brother, Louis de France, Duke of Burgundy, was in line to the throne right after their father, Le Grand Dauphin, thus leaving him and his younger brother, Charles de France, Duke of Berry little expectation to ever rule over France.

Claims to the Spanish throne
In the year 1700, the King of Spain, Charles II, died. Charles' will named the 16-year-old Philip, the grandson of Charles' sister Maria Theresa of Spain, as his successor. Upon any possible refusal the Crown of Spain would be offered next to Philip's younger brother Charles, Duke of Berry, or, next, to Archduke Charles of Austria.

By genealogical right alone, the Spanish throne should have passed to Louis, Grand Dauphin, son of King Louis XIV of France and Maria Theresa of Spain, sister of Charles II and daughter of Philip IV of Spain. However, the Grand Dauphin was the heir apparent to the throne of France; the union of France and Spain would greatly upset the balance of power in Europe. Thus, Charles had settled on Philip, the second son of the Grand Dauphin (whose prospect of inheriting France was slim).

However, the Austrian branch claimed that Philip's grandmother had renounced the Spanish throne for her descendants as part of her marriage contract. This was countered by the French branch's claim that it was on the basis of a dowry that had never been paid.

After a long council meeting where the Dauphin spoke up in favor of his son's rights, it was agreed that Philip would ascend the throne but would forever renounce his claim to the throne of France for himself and his descendants. This, however, contradicted a fundamental principle of the French succession - the right of a legitimate male prince to succeed cannot be alienated. This conflict would manifest in the War of Spanish Succession. In the Treaty of Utrecht that ended the war, Philip finally agreed to renounce for himself and his descendants, his rights to the French throne only after the introduction of semi-Salic law in Spain.

War of Spanish Succession
However, the other powers of Europe contested the idea, eventually leading to the War of Spanish Succession (1701–1714). Although Philip was allowed to remain on the Spanish throne, Spain was forced to cede Menorca and Gibraltar to Great Britain; the Spanish Netherlands, Naples, Milan, and Sardinia to the Austrian Habsburgs; and Sicily and parts of the Milanese to Savoy.

These losses greatly diminished the Spanish Empire in Europe, which had already been in decline. Throughout his reign, Philip sought to reverse the decline of Spanish power as Great Britain increasingly began to dominate at sea.

Philip's descendants

Legitimate issue by Maria Luisa of Savoy

Louis I of Spain

Ferdinand VI of Spain

Legitimate issue by Elisabeth of Parma

Charles III of Spain

Marianna Victoria of Spain

Philip, Duke of Parma

Maria Teresa Rafaela of Spain

Luis de Borbón y Farnesio, 13th Count of Chinchón

Maria Antonietta of Spain

References

Lists of Spanish nobility
Spanish royalty
House of Bourbon (Spain)
Philip V of Spain